The 2021–22 All-Ireland Junior Club Football Championship was the 20th staging of the All-Ireland Junior Club Football Championship since its establishment by the Gaelic Athletic Association. It was the first club championship to be completed in two years due to the COVID-19 pandemic.

The All-Ireland final was played on 6 February 2022 at Croke Park in Dublin, between Kilmeena and Gneeveguilla. Kilmeena won the match by 0-11 to 1-06 to claim their first ever championship title.

All-Ireland Junior Club Football Championship

All-Ireland final

All-Ireland final

References

2021 in Irish sport
2022 in Irish sport
All-Ireland Junior Club Football Championship
All-Ireland Junior Club Football Championship